Owen Pierce Thompson (February 3, 1852 - August 30, 1933) was a judge of the Seventh Judicial District of Illinois and a delegate to the 1904 Democratic National Convention. He also served on the Illinois State Utilities Commission.

Biography
Thompson was born in Morgan County, Illinois on February 3, 1852, the eighth and youngest child of James B. Thompson and Mary Meguier. He attended the local schools, the completed the course of instruction for schoolteachers at Illinois Normal Institute in Normal, Illinois.

After receiving his teaching qualification, Thompson taught school for four years. He then began attendance at Albany Law School, from which he graduated in 1876. He was admitted to the bar and settled in Jacksonville, Illinois, where he began a practice. In 1886, Thompson was elected judge of Morgan County, Illinois, and he was reelected in 1890. In 1897, Thompson was elected judge of the Seventh Judicial District. He served until 1912, when he resigned to accept appointment to the Illinois Commerce Commission.

Thompson died in Jacksonville on August 30, 1933. He was buried at Diamond Grove Cemetery in Jacksonville.

Family
In 1883, Thompson married Elizabeth Ruddick of Jacksonville. They were the parents of thee children, Mary, Paul, and Irene.

References

1852 births
1933 deaths
Illinois state court judges
Illinois Democrats
People from Morgan County, Illinois
Illinois State University alumni
Albany Law School alumni